Kakulia is a Georgian surname. Notable people with the surname include:
Merab Kakulia (born 1961), Georgian economist
Teimuraz Kakulia (1947—2006), Soviet tennis player and Soviet/Georgian tennis coach

Surnames of Georgian origin
Georgian-language surnames
Surnames of Abkhazian origin